ΝΗΠΙΑΓΩΓΕΙΟΝ: Live in Europe 1988 (Nipiagogeion, kindergarten) is a live album by American post-punk band Savage Republic, released in 1990 by Fundamental Records.

Track listing

Personnel
Adapted from the ΝΗΠΙΑΓΩΓΕΙΟΝ: Live in Europe 1988 liner notes.

Savage Republic
 Philip Drucker (as Jackson Del Rey) – instruments
 Thom Furhmann – instruments
 Greg Grunke – instruments
 Brad Laner – instruments
 Bruce Licher – instruments, design

Production
 Savage Republic – production

Release history

References

External links 
 

1990 live albums
Savage Republic albums